Pyrgulina interstriata is a species of sea snail, a marine gastropod mollusk in the family Pyramidellidae, the pyrams and their allies.

Description
The thin shell is subpellucid, somewhat glossy, and cinereous. The length of the shell measures 4 mm. The seven whorls of the teleoconch are longitudinally ribbed. The interstices are marked by close spiral striae;. The columella contains a stout fold.

Distribution
This species occurs in the Pacific Ocean off New Caledonia, Samoa and Fiji Islands.

References

External links
 To World Register of Marine Species

Pyramidellidae
Gastropods described in 1866